Boniface IV Paleologo, Marquis of Montferrat (21 December 1512 – 6 June 1530) was an Italian nobleman. He succeeded his father William IX, Marquis of Montferrat from 1518. His mother was Anna d'Alençon (1492–1562).

Boniface never married and died childless in 1530, after falling from his horse. He was succeeded by his uncle, John George, Bishop of Casale.

References

Sources

Ancestry

1512 births
1530 deaths
Palaiologos dynasty
Marquesses of Montferrat